Desulfobotulus  is a Gram-negative, anaerobic, non-spore-forming and motile bacteria genus from the family of Desulfobacteraceae.

References

Further reading 
 

Desulfobacterales
Bacteria genera